Yustin Djanelidze (Russian: Юстин Джанелидзе, ; 27 October 1883 – 14 January 1950) was a Soviet-Georgian lieutenant general, Hero of Socialist Labour, and pioneer of cardiac surgery in the 20th century. The era of successful aortic surgery began on 27 October 1913 when Djanelidze sutured a penetrating injury of the ascending aorta in St. Petersburg, Russia. This was the first case of successful ascending aorta repair described in the world medical literature.

External links
Biography at pubmed.com
 Djanelidze Research Institute of Emergency Medicine at www.emergency.spb.ru

Soviet surgeons
1883 births
1950 deaths
Military personnel from Georgia (country)
Generals from Georgia (country)
Soviet Georgian generals
Soviet lieutenant generals
Soviet military doctors
20th-century surgeons
Heroes of Socialist Labour